The Battle of Pantelleria (1586) also known as the Fight at Pantalarea was a naval engagement that took place during the Anglo–Spanish War off the island of Pantelleria on 13 July 1586. The encounter was between an English armed merchant fleet of five ships of the Levant Company in convoy under Edward Wilkinson and a fleet of eleven Spanish and Maltese galleys under Don Pedro de Leyva. The English managed to repel all the attacks and returned home unmolested. Although minor the battle had significant consequences in testing English firepower of which was to be used against the Spanish armada two years later when England was under threat of invasion.

Background
The Company of Merchants of the Levant (or the Turkey Company) had been trading in the Mediterranean since 1580 after a successful petition to Queen Elizabeth I. They had established "factories" in Aleppo (its headquarters), as well as Constantinople, Alexandria, and Smyrna. After the Treaty of Nonsuch in 1585 and the execution  of Mary, Queen of Scots in February 1587, Philip II of Spain decided that it was time to invade England and war was declared. As a result, the Levant company armed their ships as part of an investment by the English crown.

Philip II's maritime force lay within the Straits of Gibraltar where two squadrons of galleys were cruising under Giovanni Andrea Doria. Further in was the Sicilian squadron, composed of Spanish and Maltese galleys, under Captain-General Don Pedro de Leyva (who had replaced Don Alonso Martinez de Leyva the previous year). Both Doria and Leyva had orders to intercept any English merchant fleets which would have to sail through them.

Five of the Levant company's ships left London in November 1585 - the 300 ton galleon Merchant Royal (being head of the fleet) under 'acting Admiral' Edward Wilkinson and the William and John were bound for Tripoli and the Toby for Constantinople. The Susan and the 300 ton armed merchant galleon Edward Bonaventure were bound for Venice. After completing their trading ventures, the ships met at Zante (Zakynthos) and after provisioning for the voyage home they set out together.

Encounter
On 13 July 1586, near the island of Pantelleria, between Tunis and Sicily, they soon sighted a number of ships that turned out to be galleys, eleven in all supported by two frigates. Wilkinson ordered the ships to venture close to the coast of the island so that they could not be surrounded and then ordered the ships ready for action. The sakers, culverins, and demi culverins would show how well they fared since in ship-to-ship combat they had yet to be tested at sea in English service.

The Spanish admiral Don Pedro de Leyva closed in but did not attack instead sending a messenger aboard the Merchant Royal; they asked what they were doing and where they had come from. The English explained that trade had bought them to Turkey and were returning home to England. De Leyva then demanded to acknowledge their duty and obedience to the Spanish king but this was flatly refused by Wilkinson. After more demands were refused De Leyva then sent an ultimatum they would, 'either be sunk or be escorted into port' but he was rebuffed once more and the two fleets prepared for battle.

Battle
The admiral's galley fired the first shot which was responded by a culverin from the Merchant Royal and the action began. Each English ship matched itself with two Spanish galleys and fighting became bitter, the Spanish attempted to board which was the galleys principal military function. The English however kept up a steady rate of fire from their recently applied twenty pounder culverins (of which there were four in each ship) and twelve pounder demi-culverins (ten in each ship) as well as short-range perriers which had an effect in terms of accuracy and long-range damage infliction.

The Spanish and Maltese galleys could not get in close enough range of the English ships to use their big fifty pounder guns, mounted in the waist line without being seriously damaged. One galley did get in close enough to bravely fire off two shots which caused the only English casualties; in the Susan before being forced off by her guns.  William and John was very nearly a casualty after briefly touching the bottom in the shallows as they were hugging the shoreline but the wind was strong enough to carry it forward to safety.

Soon de Leyva realized the attack was producing far more harm to his galleys and frigates and hardly any on the English. Even de Leyva's flag galley had sustained heavy damage and soon it warped from the fight, and after a few hours more fighting the rest of the Spanish ships had repeated the same feat. Most of them had sustained some form of damage and some were fighting to stay afloat, while the English edging away from the coast still in convoy formation, headed West.

Aftermath
The battle, which had lasted nearly five hours, had ended and the galleys withdrew immediately to the nearest port in Sicily for repairs.  In order to get keep his flagship afloat, Leyva had to lash three of his seriously damaged galleys together, including his own in order to keep them from sinking.

After fending off the Spanish attack, the English counted the costs but found very little, they had only two killed and fifteen wounded principally from the Susan and there was no serious damage to any of their ships. They put into Algiers for supplies, and then successfully ran the gauntlet of a second group of Spanish galleys which was waiting for them in the Gibraltar straits. No fight took place here as the English sailed through with the help of a heavy mist; as the galleys saw them they tried to catch up, but it was too late.

The English returned home safely and news of the battle soon reached Cairo where the Company men were in conference on agreeing trade there, they received the news with alarm but were ecstatic with the results. Learning from the battle they agreed to use exactly the same military strategy for every Levant Company trading mission.

The Levant company now knew what to do when entering hostile waters most notably in the Strait of Gibraltar. Here in 1590 an attempt was made by the Spanish on the same company ships but were repelled and again nearly a year later, that led to the same outcome. As a result of the battle the Royal Navy found heavy use of the Levant company ships. In terms of fighting it was a huge test for the future of the fighting ship of the line and the 'death knell' of the war galley.

See also
 Battle of the Strait of Gibraltar (1590)
 Battle of the Strait of Gibraltar (1591)
 Operation Corkscrew

References
Citations

Bibliography
 
 
 
 
 
 
 
 
 
 

Naval battles of the Anglo-Spanish War (1585–1604)
Conflicts in 1586
Naval battles involving Spain
Naval battles involving the Knights Hospitaller
Naval battles involving England
1586 in Europe
1586 in the British Empire
1586 in the Spanish Empire
1586 in Italy
16th-century military history of Spain